New Iberia Senior High School is a senior high school in New Iberia, Louisiana, United States. It is in the Iberia Parish School System. It is located at 1301 E. Admiral Doyle Dr. New Iberia, LA 70560

It serves New Iberia and Avery Island.

Athletics
New Iberia Senior High athletics competes in the LHSAA.

List of sports:

M Baseball
M/W Basketball
Cheerleading
M/W Cross Country
Dance Team
M Football
M/W Golf
M/W Gymnastics
M/W Powerlifting
M/W Soccer
W Softball
M/W Swim Team
M/W Tennis
M/W Athletics
W Volleyball

See also
 New Iberia High School (1926 building)

References

External links
 New Iberia Senior High School
 

Public high schools in Louisiana
Schools in Iberia Parish, Louisiana
New Iberia, Louisiana